Cornelius Stewart (born 7 October 1989) is a Saint Vincentian professional footballer who currently plays as a forward or winger for Sheikh Jamal Dhanmondi Club in the Bangladesh Football Premier League.

Club career
Stewart attended Kingstown Anglican Primary School and Intermediate High School, and began his career in 2001 with the youth soccer team System 3 FC on his home island of Saint Vincent. He moved to Newwill Hope International FC of the Saint Vincent and the Grenadines National League Championship in 2007, and played for them throughout the 2007–08 season, before moving to Canada in 2009 when he joined the Vancouver Whitecaps Residency programme.

He was promoted to the Vancouver Whitecaps senior team in 2010, and played for their reserve squad in 2011 after Vancouver moved to Major League Soccer season. After being released from the reserve team, Stewart signed for Caledonia AIA of the TT Pro League.

After one season with Caledonia, Stewart signed with Oulun Palloseura of Finland's second tier, Ykkönen, on a 1-year contract following a ten-day trial with the club. Following a season with Oulun Palloseura in which Stewart scored 10 goals in 28 matches, Stewart signed a 1+1 contract with Vaasan Palloseura of the Veikkausliiga, Finland's premier division, following a month-long trial. It was announced on 1 April 2015 that after one season with VPS, Stewart signed a 1+1 deal with PS Kemi Kings.

In 2017 it was reported that Stewart had joined T.C. Sports Club of the Dhivehi League in the Maldives. Since then, he has go on to score a total of 22 goals in his debut season in the Maldives in all competition.

At the end of January 2019, Stewart joined Indian I-League club Minerva Punjab FC. Stewart returned to Maziya for the 2019–20 season.

International career
Stewart played for the St Vincent U-20 team, netting 10 goals in 10 games, before making his debut for the senior team in a 2010 FIFA World Cup qualification game, against Canada.

International goals 
Score lists Saint Vincent and the Grenadine's goal tally first.

References

External links

 VPS Profile
 Caledonia AIA Profile
 
 

1989 births
Living people
Saint Vincent and the Grenadines footballers
Saint Vincent and the Grenadines expatriate footballers
Association football midfielders
Saint Vincent and the Grenadines expatriate sportspeople in Canada
Expatriate soccer players in Canada
Association football forwards
Vancouver Whitecaps Residency players
Vancouver Whitecaps (1986–2010) players
Vancouver Whitecaps FC U-23 players
Vaasan Palloseura players
Oulun Palloseura players
Kemi City F.C. players
RoundGlass Punjab FC players
Maziya S&RC players
People from Kingstown
USL League Two players
USSF Division 2 Professional League players
TT Pro League players
Ykkönen players
Veikkausliiga players
Expatriate footballers in Finland
Expatriate footballers in India
People from Saint Andrew Parish, Saint Vincent and the Grenadines
Saint Vincent and the Grenadines international footballers
Saint Vincent and the Grenadines under-20 international footballers